James Wormworth is an American drummer and percussionist. Wormworth is a member of Jimmy Vivino and the Basic Cable Band on the TBS late night comedy program, Conan. Wormworth often appeared as house drummer during the band's run as The Max Weinberg 7 on Late Night with Conan O'Brien. Wormworth joined the band as a full-time member when O'Brien became the host of The Tonight Show with Conan O'Brien.

Wormworth is the band's full-time drummer on O'Brien's TBS talk show Conan.

Wormworth has a strong preference toward playing the drums with his feet completely bare, as exhibited when he wears a full suit with bare feet while playing on television.

He is the son of the jazz drummer Jimmy Wormworth and the brother of bass guitarist Tracy Wormworth.

References

External links

Year of birth missing (living people)
Living people
African-American drummers
American drummers
The Max Weinberg 7 members
The Tonight Show Band members
Jimmy Vivino and the Basic Cable Band members